Mason M. Massey IV (born January 24, 1997) is an American professional stock car racing driver. He competes full-time in the NASCAR Craftsman Truck Series, driving the No. 33 Ford F-150 for Reaume Brothers Racing.

Racing career

K&N Pro Series East
Massey competed in two NASCAR K&N Pro Series East races in 2014.

Craftsman Truck Series
Massey made his NASCAR Gander Outdoors Truck Series debut in the 2019 M&M's 200 at Iowa Speedway. He placed 22nd in the event, and was moved up one position after Ross Chastain's DQ.

Xfinity Series
On January 28, 2020, it was announced that Massey would drive the No. 99 for B. J. McLeod Motorsports for a portion of the 2020 NASCAR Xfinity Series season, with his first race at Las Vegas Motor Speedway. After the season was over, Massey returned to a track that he raced earlier in his career to win the dirt crate late model feature at Senoia Raceway's Fall Nationals.

Massey rejoined BJMM and the No. 99 on a 12-race schedule in 2021.

In 2022, he joined DGM Racing to drive the No. 91 for every oval race. Massey achieved a career best 6th place finish at the spring Atlanta race.

Motorsports career results

NASCAR
(key) (Bold – Pole position awarded by qualifying time. Italics – Pole position earned by points standings or practice time. * – Most laps led.)

Xfinity Series

Craftsman Truck Series

 Season still in progress
 Ineligible for series points

K&N Pro Series East

References

External links
 
 

1997 births
Living people
NASCAR drivers
Racing drivers from Atlanta
Racing drivers from Georgia (U.S. state)
People from Douglasville, Georgia
Sportspeople from the Atlanta metropolitan area